A Place in the Sun is the third album by the California soft rock group Pablo Cruise. The album marked an entrance into the mainstream for the band, and the first single from the album, "Whatcha Gonna Do?" reached number 6 on the Pop Singles charts. The title track, "A Place in the Sun" was the second and less successful single on the album, reaching number 42, but remains the favorite among many fans of the band today. The track "Raging Fire" was released as the B-side of "I Go to Rio" in 1978. This was the group's last album with original bassist Bud Cockrell, who left the band after its release.

Track listing

Side One
"A Place in the Sun" (Cockrell, Lerios) – 4:44 (lead singer: Bud Cockrell)
"Whatcha Gonna Do?" (Jenkins, Lerios) – 4:17 (lead singers: Dave Jenkins, Bud Cockrell)
"Raging Fire" (Jenkins, Lerios) – 4:41 (lead singer: Dave Jenkins)
"I Just Wanna Believe" (Lerios) – 4:15 (lead singer: Bud Cockrell)
"Tonight My Love" (Lerios) – 3:53 (lead singers: Dave Jenkins, Bud Cockrell)

Side Two
"Can't You Hear the Music?" (Lerios, Price) – 4:07 (lead singer: Bud Cockrell)
"Never Had a Love" (Jenkins, Lerios) – 5:08 (lead singer: Dave Jenkins)
"Atlanta June" (Jenkins, Price) – 4:08 (lead singer: Dave Jenkins)
"El Verano" (Cockrell, Jenkins, Lerios, Price) – 4:40 (instrumental)

Charts

Personnel
Pablo Cruise
David Jenkins - guitars, lead vocals
Steve Price - percussion, drums
Bud Cockrell - bass, lead vocals
Cory Lerios - piano, keyboards, backing vocals

Production
Bill Schnee - producer, engineer
John Morris - design, photography
Mike Reese - mastering

References

Pablo Cruise albums
1977 albums
A&M Records albums
Albums produced by Bill Schnee